Ergun Öztuna (born August 16, 1937 in Akhisar, Manisa Province) was a Turkish football player of Fenerbahçe. He played as a forward and was known as Puskas Ergun due to his top-class technique.

He started his professional career with Karşıyaka S.K. and then transferred to Fenerbahçe where he played five years between 1956-61. He also played with Bursaspor, Austria Klagenfurt in Austria, Karşıyaka SK (again) and last Fenerbahçe (1964–71). He also played with Rizespor on loan from Fenerbahçe SK.

He scored 79 goals in 219 matches for Fenerbahçe SK.

References

1937 births
Living people
People from Akhisar
Turkish footballers
Turkey international footballers
Fenerbahçe S.K. footballers
Turkey youth international footballers
Association football forwards